Kumasi Academy also known as KUMACA is a public, senior high school located in Asokore-Mampong, in the Ashanti Region of Ghana.

History
The Academy was founded in 1956 by the Ghana Baptist Convention as Sadler Baptist College. In 1960, the seminary was moved from Asokore-Mampong to Abuakwa, leaving the secondary school at its present location, Asokore-Mampong. Poe was later succeeded by Madam Nadine Lovan, another white missionary, as the head of the Sadler Baptist School. The school has since become one of the most popular schools in Ghana because of the Baptist missionaries' strict adherence to discipline.

Later, the then government wanted to have a say in the administration and running of the school. The Baptist Mission was not the type that would take kindly to that policy and was not prepared to acquiesce in this interference since it believed in the complete separation between religion and government. In circumstances, the Mission found it more expedient to leave the scene and handed over the school to the government on two conditions, viz, that the name "Sadler Baptist" be changed and that the teaching of religion in the school should be in the hands of the Baptist Mission. The government accepted this offer and "Sadler Baptist Secondary School" was eventually phased out.

On Saturday, 9th July, 2022, the ultramodern Akunini Science Laboratory was commissioned in the school to enhance STEM education. It is a legacy project that was fully funded by the alumni association known as Akunini Global.

Curriculum
Kumasi Academy is one of the top senior high schools in Ghana, noted for its excellent performances in both internal and external examinations. In view of this, it is also noted for the nurturing and producing purely academicians who occupy very important positions in Ghana and abroad.

Notable alumni

 Ernest Adu-Gyamfi – Executive President, Ghana Baptist Convention and chairman, Christian Council of Ghana
Kwame Bawuah-Edusei – Physician, entrepreneur and former diplomat
 Dan Botwe MP – Okere Constituency
 Peter Mac Manu – Former Chairman, NPP
Alan John Kyerematen – Minister of Trade & Industry
 Solomon Osei-Akoto – Deputy minister in the Second Republic
 Gordon Prempeh – Former footballer of Kumasi Asante Kotoko 
Black Sherif – Musician, rapper
 Kwame Achampong-Kyei – Founder Glico Group
 Amerley Ollennu Awua-Asamoa – Ghana's former Ambassador to Denmark
 Welbeck Ampadu – Senior Director/ Producer, Multimedia Group Limited

See also
 List of senior secondary schools in Ghana

References

External links
 Kumasi Academy Old Students Association
 Kumasi Academy Past Students Association
 Kumasi Academy Alumni

Educational institutions established in 1957
High schools in Ghana
Schools in Ghana
1957 establishments in Ghana
Education in Ghana